Kosmos 15 ( meaning Cosmos 15) or Zenit-2 No.9 was a Soviet optical film-return reconnaissance satellite which was launched in 1963. A Zenit-2 spacecraft, Kosmos 15 was the ninth of eighty-one such satellites to be launched.

Spacecraft
Kosmos 15 was a Zenit-2 satellite, a first generation, low resolution, reconnaissance satellite derived from the Vostok spacecraft used for crewed flights, the satellites were developed by OKB-1. In addition to reconnaissance, it was also used for research into radiation in support of the Vostok programme.

Mission
The Vostok-2 rocket, serial number T15000-08, was used to launch Kosmos 15. The launch took place at 08:24 GMT on 22 April 1963, using Site 1/5 at the Baikonur Cosmodrome. Following its successful arrival in orbit the spacecraft received its Kosmos designation, along with the International Designator 1963-011A and the Satellite Catalog Number 00569. In addition to reconnaissance, Kosmos 15 carried an experiment package to measure radiation levels in its environment and was also used for meteorological research.

Kosmos 15 was operated in a low Earth orbit. Having spent five days in orbit, the spacecraft was deorbited on 27 April 1963. Its return capsule descended under parachute and was recovered by the Soviet forces in steppe in Kazakhstan.

See also

 1963 in spaceflight

References

Spacecraft launched in 1963
Kosmos satellites
Spacecraft which reentered in 1963
Zenit-2 satellites